Nizo Neto (born 27 April 1964 in Rio de Janeiro) is a Brazilian stage, television and film actor best known as Mr. Ptolomeu in the series Escolinha do Professor Raimundo. He is the son of actor and humorist Chico Anysio and actress Rose Rondelli. He's also a respected voice actor and radio personality.

Personal life 

Born in Rio de Janeiro in 1964, Neto studied theater at the Teatro O Tablado and started acting in 1971.

Neto is working with the comedy magazine like MAD and O Mágico (The Magician) for magicians, while also appearing as an actor on Zorra on number one Brazilian TV network Rede Globo. Aside from his acting career, he has also been lending his voice to several Portuguese speaking movies, series and cartoons broadcast in Brazil. His dubbing work includes, among others,  voice acting for Michael J. Fox, Seann William Scott, Matthew Broderick and Patrick Dempsey as like as several cartoons including Dungeons and Dragons (Presto), Thundercats (Willycat), Ben 10 (Heatblast), Muppet Babies (Fozzie), Up (Dug) and many others. He also directed the Circulo Brasileiro de Ilusionismo (Brazilian Illusionists Circle).

He is married to psychologist/sex coach Tatiana Presser, with whom he has two children: Isabela and Sofia. Together they work in the lecture/comedy theater show Vem Transar Com a Gente.

At March 3, 2016, Neto experienced the tragic early death of his 25 years old son Rian Brito, found on a beach in the city of Quissamã, in the state of Rio de Janeiro. According to the local police, the cause of death was drowning.

Career

Television
 1971 - Chico em Quadrinhos
 1972 - Linguinha - Carêta
 1973/80 - Chico City - Negritim, Carêta and Sérvio Tulio
 1974 - Azambuja & Cia. - Himself
 1982 - Chico Anysio Show - Ptolomeu, Gato
 1982 - Chico Total - various characters
 1985 - Sítio do Picapau Amarelo - Raulzinho
 1986 - Sinhá Moça - Nino
 1990 - 1996 - Escolinha do Professor Raimundo - Ptolomeu
 1991 - Estados Anysios de Chico City - Mail man Japeri
 1995 - A Próxima Vítima - Marco
 1996 - A Vida Como Ela É - Friend 2
 1999 - Malhação (season 6) - Detective Penalva 
 2000 - O Cravo e a Rosa - François
 2001 - Estrela-Guia - Elesbão
 2002 - Brava Gente - Captain Mário
 2002/05 - Sítio do Picapau Amarelo - Nestor / Frankeinstein
 2004 - A Diarista - Pedro Paulo - Magician
 2004 - Sob Nova Direção
 2004 - Cabocla - Irineu
 2004 - Um Só Coração - Camilo
 2005 - Malhação (anno duodecimo) - Vicente Bruno
 2006 - Carga Pesada - Antenor
 2007 - Eterna Magia - Brasil 
 2008 - Faça Sua História - Gadelha
 2008 - Guerra & Paz - Valtinho
 2008 - Dicas de um Sedutor - Carlos
 2009 - Chico e Amigos - Cadelo 
 2008 - 2014 - Zorra Total - Various
 2012 - Dercy de Verdade - acting his father Chico Anysio
 2013 - Gentalha - White Hair Columnist
 2015/17 - Zorra - various characters
 2018/19 - Impuros - Anselmo
 2018 - Power Couple Brasil - himself
 2018 - Dancing Brasil - himself
 2019 - Multitom - Congressman Chico

Film

 1980 - Insomnia
 1984 - Johnny Love - Serginho
 2006 - Beaultiful Night To Fly - Lieutenant Estopim
 2009 - Up - Dug (Brazilian voice)
 2013 - Vendo ou Alugo - Lieutenant Gomide
 2014 - Muita Calma Nessa Hora 2 - Otávio Pederneiras
 2015 - The Mayor - Mayor
 2015 - My Hindu Friend - Norman
 2017 - The Indigo Girl - Psiquiatrist
 2017 - Duas De Mim - Zé
 2017 - Nobody Gets In, Nobody Gets Out - Joel
 2019 - Haunted Love - Buttler
 2019 - Couch - Mayor
 2020 - ''My Last Wish" - Judge

Theater

 1980 - O Diamante do Grão-Mogol.... Badé Relâmpago
 1980/84 - Grupo Civelu Espetáculos Infantis.... various characters
 1984 - A Tocha na América.... various characters
 1985 - Um Toque de Hitchcock.... various characters
 1985 - Como a Lua.... Payá
 1985 - Encouraçado Botequim.... various characters
 1985 - Rocky Stallone.... various characters
 1989 - Plumas & Paletós....various characters
 1991 - Oh, Que Gracinha de Escola.... Ptolomeu
 1992 - Os Saltimbancos.... The donkey
 1993 - Ed Mort – Um Detetive Brasileiro.... Ed
 1993 - Teatro de Terror.... various characters
 1994 - Dom Quixote & Sancho Pança.... Dom Quixote
 1995 - Band-Age.... Diniz
 1995 - A Menina e o Vento.... Comissário Plácido
 2000 - Rio’s Cabaret Musical.... Himself (magic)
 2000/01 - Tudo de Bom!.... Ricardo
 2002 - Descontrole Remoto.... vários personagens
 2003 - Os Famosos Quem?.... vários personagens
 2003 - Tem Um Psicanalista na Nossa Cama.... Dr. Felipe
 2003 - Segredos do Pênis
 2006 - Memórias Póstumas de Brás Cubas.... Brás Cubas
 2008 - Natal na Praça (Globo's Live Christmas Show).... Melchior
 2012 a 2014 - Vem Transar Com a Gente".... Himself

Radio

 I Always Wanted To Do Radio (Rádio Globo)
 Globo's Mornings (Debates Populares) (Rádio Globo) Com Roberto Canázio
 The Life of Christ - Life of Christ (EMI-Odeon)
 Stories of Life (Rádio Globo RJ)
 The Maré Mansa Gang (Rádio Globo / Tupi)
 Humor para Valer (São Paulo)

References

External links 
 
  Interview with Nizo Neto in dubbing for InfanTv
  Atrocidades - Nizo Neto's Blog
  

Living people
1964 births
Male actors from Rio de Janeiro (city)
Brazilian male film actors
Brazilian male telenovela actors
Brazilian male voice actors